The Medtronic TC 1 Mile is a 1 mile road race held in the Twin Cities.

History 
The race's inauguration was in 2009, where it served as the USATF 1 Mile Road Championships. It is held as one event in the Twin Cities in Motion race series, which includes the Twin Cities Marathon and the TC 10 Mile. The 1 mile race is ran in heats, with gender specific sections for the fastest heats. Other heats are mixed genders based upon seed times. The race has a purse of $15,000, with additional bonuses for breaking 4:00 or for breaking the course record.

Results 
Key:

References 

Sports in Minneapolis–Saint Paul
Foot races in Minnesota
Tourist attractions in Minneapolis
Recurring sporting events established in 2010
Annual events in Minnesota
Annual sporting events in the United States
2010 establishments in Minnesota